Anisocoma acaulis (scale bud) is a wildflower found in the Mojave, Colorado Deserts, and California's Owens Valley above  (states of Arizona, Nevada, California, Baja California, and Sonora), up to about 7000 ft.

It is the only known member of genus Anisocoma.

The plant grows a flat mat of jagged lobed leaves that lie on the ground. It sends up stalks up to 20 centimeters tall topped with flowers which bloom from April to June. The flowers may be yellow or white with yellow centers. The frilly ray florets are rectangular with flat or slightly toothed tips. This flower is found growing in colonies in sandy places and washes, and bleeds milky sap if cut. The common name "scale bud" is a reference to the scaly appearance of the closed flower bud.

References 

 Mojave Desert Wildflowers, Jon Mark Stewart, 1998, pg. 107
 Wildflowers of the Eastern Sierra and adjoining Mojave Desert and Great Basin. Laird R. Blackwell, 2002, pg.59

External links 
  Calflora: Anisocoma acaulis (Scalebud)
 Jepson Manual Treatment
 USDA Plants Profile
 UC Photos gallery

Cichorieae
Flora of California
Flora of Arizona
Flora of Nevada
Flora of the California desert regions
Natural history of the California chaparral and woodlands
Natural history of the Mojave Desert
Natural history of the Peninsular Ranges
Natural history of the Transverse Ranges
Monotypic Asteraceae genera
Taxa named by Asa Gray
Taxa named by John Torrey
Flora without expected TNC conservation status